Kate Bristol (born May 1, 1990) is an American stage and voice actress.

Biography
Bristol began voice acting at the age of 11. Her debut show was Fruits Basket and she played the role of Kisa Sohma. Since then, Bristol has been in many more productions from Funimation including Strike Witches, Dragon Ball GT and Negima. In 2008, Bristol moved to New York City to pursue a stage career. She attended college at Pace University. Bristol has since appeared in the National Tour of the Wizard of Oz and provided the voice of many characters in several episodes of the Pokémon anime, such as Laverre City gym leader Valerie, among many other roles.

Personal life
Bristol married Winston Nget on October 15, 2016. She announced her pregnancy December 21, 2017. The couple has one daughter together, Amelia Nget, who was born on June 24, 2018. One month later, they all moved back to the Dallas, Texas area.

Filmography

Anime

Animation

Film

Video games

References

External links

1990 births
Living people
Actresses from Dallas
Actresses from New York City
American child actresses
American stage actresses
American video game actresses
American voice actresses
Pace University alumni
Place of birth missing (living people)
21st-century American actresses